was a Japanese airline and the predecessor of Japan Air System. Founded on November 30, 1953, it merged with Japan Domestic Airlines on May 15, 1971, to form Toa Domestic Airlines, which went on to become Japan Air System.

Aircraft operated

During operations, Toa Airways operated the following types:

de Havilland Dove
de Havilland Heron
Convair CV-240 family
Beechcraft Model 18
Beechcraft Twin Bonanza
NAMC YS-11
Cessna 170

Accidents and incidents 
 Flight 63- A NAMC YS-11A-217 crashed en route from Chitose Airport near Sapporo, Japan to Hakodate Airport.  After arriving in Hakodate airspace, the plane was descending below 1800 meters when it crashed into the south face of Yokotsudake (Yokotsu Mountain). All 64 passengers and four crew on board perished. The cause of the crash was determined to be pilot error that followed strong winds pushing the plane off course.

References

External links 
News On The Successing Of Japan Domestic Airlines And Toa Japanese Airlines

 
Defunct airlines of Japan
Airlines established in 1953
Airlines disestablished in 1971
Japanese companies established in 1953
1971 disestablishments in Japan